Live at St. Gallen is a 2005 live CD and DVD by The John Butler Trio recorded in St. Gallen, Switzerland. The CD version peaked at No. 47 on the ARIA Albums Chart. The two CDs included in the set were recorded live at St. Gallen, whereas the DVD was recorded at the Sydney Opera House in 2004. The cover art was designed by John Butler Trio regular Tom Walker. On the Australian edition, the credits for the DVD include "In memory of Paul Hester", the original drummer from Crowded House. By the end of 2005 the album was certified gold by Australian Recording Industry Association (ARIA).

Track listing
All songs were written by John Butler.

Disc one
"Treat Yo Mama" – 7:55
"Company Sin" – 5:11
"Somethings Gotta Give" – 3:24
"What You Want" – 8:35
"Band Introduction" – 0:25
"Oldman" – 5:49
"Ocean" – 11:38

Disc two
"Peaches and Cream" – 7:25
"Pickapart" – 6:45
"Betterman" – 16:44
"Hello" – 5:44
"Zebra" – 4:37
"Take" – 11:21

DVD
"Bound to Ramble"
"Attitude"
"Treat Yo Mama"
"Company Sin"
"Seeing Angels"
"Ocean"
"Peaches and Cream"
"Betterman"
"Somethings Gotta Give"
"Zebra"
"Interview with audience"

Bonus with sunrise over the sea
"Hello" – 5:44
"Zebra" – 4:37
"Peaches and Cream" – 7:25
"Ocean" – 11:38

Personnel
The John Butler Trio are managed by Phil Stevens.

Band members
John Butler - vocals, guitar
Shannon Birchall - bass guitar
Michael Barker - drums

Road crew
Colin Ellis
Julian Cribb
Jane Wiltshire-Butler
Stephane Popoff
Cole Xuereb
Rafael Lazzaro
Julie Bright

Production
Recording - DRS 3, Switzerland
Engineering - Patrick Miller
Mastering - Ron Kurz
Additional editing - Shaun O'Callaghan
Photography - Paul Smith Images, Twenty Twenty Imaging

Charts

Certifications

References 

John Butler Trio albums
2005 live albums
Live video albums
2005 video albums